Peer Gynt is a 1938 opera by Werner Egk to a libretto after the play Peer Gynt by Henrik Ibsen. The premiere took place on 24 November 1938 at the Berliner Staatsoper where Egk was the conductor at the time. 

The opera was controversial in the Nazi press. This criticism was quashed when Adolf Hitler, an attendee at the performance, allegedly approved of the work. Despite Stravinsky-like music, the premiere met the approval of Joseph Goebbels, which has since tainted both the opera and composer. The opera was not performed in the Third Reich after 1940.

Recording
Peer Gynt, Wilfried Vorwold (bass), Kari Løvaas (soprano), Norma Sharp (soprano), Cornelia Wulkopf (alto), Janet Perry (soprano), Waldemar Wild (bass). Symphonieorchester des Bayerischen Rundfunks, Heinz Wallberg,  Orfeo Classics 1982

References

1938 operas
Works based on Peer Gynt
German-language operas
Operas by Werner Egk
Operas